Kix or KIX may refer to:

Music
 Kix Brooks (born 1955), member of the country music duo Brooks & Dunn
 Kix (band), American band who achieved popularity in the 1980s
 Kix (album), 1981 debut album by Kix
 "Kix" (song), a 1997 song released by Per Gessle (from Roxette)
 Lee Thompson (saxophonist) (born 1957), nicknamed Kix, member of the band Madness

Broadcasting
 Kix 87.6 FM, Wellington, New Zealand, radio station
 Kix 96.2 FM, British radio station
 Kix 106, former name of radio station Mix 106.3
 KIX Country, a narrowcast country music radio station in Australia
 Kix FM, a community radio station in Kangaroo Island, Australia
 Kix (UK and Ireland TV channel), a UK children's and teen's television channel
 Kix (Asian TV channel), a television channel owned by a Hong Kong-based company

Transportation
 Kansai International Airport, IATA code KIX, serving the Osaka, Kyōto, Kōbe regions in Japan

Computing and science
 KiXtart, a Windows scripting language
 KIX domain, protein interaction domain in the P300-CBP coactivator family

Other
 Kix (cereal), a breakfast cereal
 KIX barcode (Klant index), a barcode type; see RM4SCC

See also

 Kixx (disambiguation)
 Kick (disambiguation), includes uses of the plural, "kicks"